Lionel Bertrand (March 10, 1906 – March 26, 1979) was a Canadian politician, journalist and newspaper editor. Born in St. Jovite, Quebec, Bertrand was elected to the House of Commons of Canada in the 1940 election as an Independent Liberal to represent the riding of Terrebonne. He joined the Liberal Party for the 1945 election and was re-elected that year then re-elected in 1949 and in 1953. He was also a Member of the Legislative Assembly of Quebec elected in 1960 to represent the electoral district of Terrebonne. He was appointed as Provincial Secretary, followed by Minister of Tourism, Fish and Game then followed by Member of the Legislative Council of Quebec. Bertrand also authored a number of books.

Electoral record

External links
 

1906 births
1979 deaths
Independent Liberal MPs in Canada
Liberal Party of Canada MPs
People from Laurentides
Quebec Liberal Party MLCs
Quebec Liberal Party MNAs